Handle with Care is a 1932 American pre-Code film directed by David Butler and starring James Dunn, Boots Mallory, and El Brendel. Victor Jory appears in a supporting role. The film's working title was Divided by Two.

Cast
 James Dunn as Bill Gordon
 Boots Mallory as Helen Barlow
 El Brendel as Carl Lundstrom
 Victor Jory as 1st Public Enemy
 George Ernest as Charlie
 Frank Craven as Radio Announcer
 Pat Hartigan as Callahan
 Frank O'Connor as Police Lieutenant
 Buster Phelps as Tommy
 Louise Carver as Hat Customer
 Heinie Conklin as Cook
 Jane Withers as Young Girl

References

External links
 Handle with Care in the Internet Movie Database
 

1932 films
Films directed by David Butler
Fox Film films
1932 drama films
American drama films
American black-and-white films
1930s American films
1930s English-language films